2 mm scale, often 2 mm finescale is a specification used for railway modelling, largely for modelling British railway prototypes. It uses a scale of 2 mm on the model to 1 foot on the prototype, which scales out to 1:152.
Track and wheels are closer to dead scale replicas than commercial British N.

Standard
The 2 mm standards were proposed by Mr. H H Groves in the early 1960s and revised to their current specification in November 1963 by Geoffrey Jones. It is similar in size to the slightly larger British N scale at 1:148, and the slightly smaller European/American N scale at 1:160; though it predates both.

Since 2 mm scale is very close to the 1:148 British N scale, a hybrid specification can be modelled by rewheeling proprietary British N-scale models to the 9.42 mm track gauge. There is an advantage however in the narrower gauge as this allows more room for the outside motion of outside cylindered steam locomotives, which must be overscale in order to function correctly. This approach is often recommended for beginners. However, 2 mm-scale and hybrid-scale models do not usually sit well together due to the larger size of the latter.

Supplementary Standards 
Like Protofour, 2 mm standards have been extended to several other prototypes of both wider and narrower gauge with the same tolerances such as Brunel's  gauge, Japan Rail's  narrow gauge and so on.

FiNescale Standard 

Appreciation
One major effect of the standard is to improve the appearance of the track as opposed to N scale, where it is overly tall.  Linking carriages with three link chains has been successfully achieved in using the standard.

Support 
No ready-to-run models are available in 2 mm scale, and although there is some availability of kits and components, some model-making skill is normally required.

There is an active association, The 2mm Scale Association, for modellers in this scale, who supply components, tools and jigs, publish a bi-monthly magazine, organise local groups, and promote modelling in the scale.

Exhibition layouts
 An early example of a 2 mm layout was Rydes Vale which was created in the 1960s by H. H. Grove and his son.
 The development of the Kineton exhibition layout by the Leamington & Warwick Model Railway Society was feature in series in the British Railway Modelling magazine running from February 2016.

See also 

 N scale
 P4
 Proto:87
 ScaleSeven
 Rail transport modelling scales

References

Further reading

External links 
 
 

 
Scale model scales